Sons of Kyuss is the debut EP by American rock band Kyuss, released in 1990 under the group's original name, Sons of Kyuss. The band released it independently as a vinyl record, pressing only 500 copies. Following this release, the band shortened its name to Kyuss and included these recordings of the songs "Deadly Kiss" and "Black Widow" on their first full-length album, Wretch (1991), while re-recording "Love Has Passed Me By", "Katzenjammer", and "Isolation Desolation" for the album (the latter song's title was shortened to "Isolation").

Track listing
The EP's liner notes credit the writing of all songs to Sons of Kyuss, consisting of John Garcia, Josh Homme, Chris Cockrell, and Brant Bjork. The liner notes of Wretch, on which five of the EP's eight songs appear, give more specific writing credits, with "Deadly Kiss", "Isolation Desolation", and "Black Widow" attributed solely to Homme, while "Love Has Passed Me By" is attributed to Homme and Bjork and "Katzenjammer" to Homme and Cockrell.

Personnel
Credits adapted from the EP's liner notes.

Kyuss
John Garcia – vocals
Josh Homme – guitar
Chris Cockrell – bass guitar
Brant Bjork – drums

Production
Catherine Enny – record producer
Ron Krown – record producer
J.B. Lawrence – recording engineer
Michael Mikulka – mixing engineer
Tim Shean – assistant engineer
Tom Nunes – assistant engineer

Artwork
Merle Schoelkoph – photography
Debra Hintz – layout

References 

1990 EPs
Kyuss albums